This article lists political parties in Botswana. Botswana is a dominant-party state with the Botswana Democratic Party in power. Opposition parties are widely considered to have no real chance of gaining presidential power, they are represented in the National Assembly however.

Current parties

Political alliances

Historical

Political alliances

See also 
Politics of Botswana
Lists of political parties
Elections in Botswana
National Assembly (Botswana)

External links 

 http://psephos.adam-carr.net/countries/b/botswana/botswana2019.txt

Botswana
 
Political parties
Political parties
Botswana